Big Conspiracy is the second studio album by British rapper J Hus. It was released on 24 January 2020 by Black Butter Records/Sony Music UK for streaming and digital download. The album features production from frequent collaborator Jae5, alongside IO, TSB and Nana Rogues, plus guest appearances from Iceè TGM, Koffee, Burna Boy and Ella Mai. It follows the 2017 debut album, Common Sense, and the 2018 EP Big Spang.

Two singles were released to promote the album: "Must Be" and "No Denying", both charting in the top 40 of the UK Singles Chart. The album debuted atop the UK Albums Chart, becoming J Hus' first UK number-one album. It also charted in Belgium, Canada, the Netherlands, Ireland, Norway and Sweden. Big Conspiracy received widespread acclaim from critics and was nominated for the Brit Award for British Album of the Year in 2021.

Background
The album was officially announced by J Hus the day before release via social media, following several tracks being leaked online earlier in the week.

Critical reception

Big Conspiracy received widespread acclaim from critics. On Metacritic, which assigns a normalised rating out of 100 to reviews from mainstream publications, Big Conspiracy received a weighted average score of 86, based on ten reviews, indicating "universal acclaim".

Granting a perfect score, Dhruva Balram of NME praised the "excellent, career-defining production" and J Hus' "range and gift for incorporating multiple genres within one album", concluding it is a "career-defining collection". For The Line of Best Fit, William Rosebury wrote that Big Conspiracy "certifies J Hus as one of the most influential artists in UK music. With the expansion and growth of UK music over the past decade, many people have attempted to define what exactly UK rap or ‘underground’ music is. The truth is that it's completely undefinable – it's grime, afrobeat, soul, drill, dancehall, hip-hop, R&B, garage, jungle – it's all of them, and none of them. J Hus embodies this melting pot of sounds, and with Big Conspiracy he delivers an album that once again blazes a trail for everyone else to follow."

Track listing

Notes
 The album's tracklist was updated on 4 February 2020 to include the song "One and Only".

Charts

Weekly charts

Year-end charts

Certifications

References

2020 albums
J Hus albums
Black Butter Records albums